Matthew Testro (born 5 February 1996) is an Australian actor. He played Jake Riles in Nowhere Boys and Freddie Hopkin in The Gloaming.

Testro has appeared in the TV shows Miss Fisher's Murder Mysteries, Glitch, Neighbours, The Doctor Blake Mysteries, 800 Words, Legends and Jack Irish. He played the lead role of Jake Riles in the teen drama film Nowhere Boys: The Book of Shadows.

Filmography

References

External links
 

Living people
1996 births
Australian male film actors
Australian male television actors
People from Melbourne
Male actors from Melbourne
21st-century Australian male actors